Dehkadeh-ye Asayesh (also Romanized as Dehkadeh-ye  Āsāyesh; also known as Āsāyesh) is a village in Bakeshluchay Rural District, in the Central District of Urmia County, West Azerbaijan Province, Iran. At the 2006 census, its population was 356, in 91 families.

References 

Populated places in Urmia County